The 1958 Clemson Tigers baseball team represented Clemson University in the 1958 NCAA University Division baseball season. The team played their home games at Riggs Field in Clemson, South Carolina.

The team was coached by Bill Wilhelm, who completed his first season at Clemson.  The Tigers reached the 1958 College World Series, their first appearance in Omaha.

Roster

Schedule

References

Clemson
Clemson Tigers baseball seasons
Atlantic Coast Conference baseball champion seasons
College World Series seasons